Louis "Red" Edmund Stephens (May 10, 1930 – April 6, 2003) was an American football offensive lineman in the National Football League for the Washington Redskins.  He was a member of the famous 1951 San Francisco Dons who went undefeated (9-0) but were denied an invitation to the Orange Bowl because they refused to not include their two African-American star players: Ollie Matson and Burl Toler. The squad had ten future NFL players, five future NFL Pro-Bowlers, and three future NFL Hall of Famers – a record for a single college team.

Drafted in the 23rd round (267th pick) by the Chicago Cardinals in 1952, he started for the Washington Redskins from 1955 through 1960.  He was given the game ball against the Green Bay Packers, Oct. 19th, 1958.  Other honors included,  1955 – Associated Press: 2nd Team All-NFL at Right Guard, and 1956 – Sporting News: 1st Team All-NFL at Left Guard. In 1970, he was inducted into the University of San Francisco's Hall of Fame for football.

After professional football he was an assistant coach for the University of Notre Dame from 1960 to 1963. He was then a scout for the Philadelphia Eagles 1963–1966.

References

1930 births
2003 deaths
American football offensive guards
San Francisco Dons football players
Washington Redskins players
Players of American football from Denver